Turn Over is the first live album of the Japanese rock group Show-Ya. It is a collection of live songs recorded during concerts from the "Date Line Tour" and "Immigration Tour" in 1987, and from the "Tour of the Immigrant" in 1988. The album reached position No. 36 in the Japanese Oricon chart.

Track listing
"S・T・O・P (But I Can't...)" – 4:35
"Mizu no Naka no Toubousha" (水の中の逃亡者) – 3:57
"Shidokenaku Emotion" (しどけなくエモーション) – 4:21
"Mr. J" – 4:27
"Origination" – 0:48
"Kodoku no Meiro (Labyrinth)" (孤独の迷路（ラビリンス）) – 5:06
"Fairy" – 5:04
"Hurry Up" – 8:15
"One Way Heart" – 4:10
"You Turn Me Over" – 4:31
"Toki Wo Koete" (時を越えて) – 7:04
"Sono Ato De Koroshitai" (その後で殺したい) – 4:20
"Narcissist" (ナルシスト) – 4:10

Personnel

Band Members
Keiko Terada – vocals
Miki Igarashi – guitars
Miki Nakamura – keyboards
Satomi Senba – bass
Miki Tsunoda – drums

References

External links
Show-Ya discography 

Show-Ya albums
1988 live albums
EMI Records live albums
Japanese-language live albums